Panagiotis Sofianopoulos (born 7 July 1968) is a retired Greek football striker.

References

1968 births
Living people
Greek footballers
Panserraikos F.C. players
Olympiacos F.C. players
Association football forwards
Greece international footballers
Footballers from Serres